Yasti Bolagh (also Romanized as Yāstī Bolāgh and Yasta Bulāgh) is a village in Abgarm Rural District, Abgarm District, Avaj County, Qazvin Province, Iran. At the 2006 census, its population was 223, in 72 families.

References 

Populated places in Avaj County